Tell Shughayb (also transliterated Tel Shegheb and Tel Shghaib) is a village in northern Syria, administratively part of the Mount Simeon District of Aleppo Governorate, located just southwest of Aleppo. Nearby localities include al-Nayrab to the north, Tell Hasil to the east and as-Safira to the southeast. According to the Syria Central Bureau of Statistics, Tell Shughayb had a population of 5,110 in the 2004 census.

References

Populated places in Mount Simeon District
Villages in Aleppo Governorate